Paul Nicholas Henry (born 28 January 1988) is an English footballer who plays for Marine. He previously played in the Football League for Tranmere Rovers.

Career

Henry signed his second professional contract with Tranmere Rovers in July 2007 after captaining the reserves. The youngster, who is the nephew of former Rovers midfielder Nick Henry, is able to play in the centre of midfield or defence and was an unused substitute three times in 2007–08. He made his first appearance for the first team as a substitute during a 0–0 draw with Doncaster Rovers in November 2007 and made his first start against Luton Town a month later. In January 2008, Henry joined Welsh Premier League side The New Saints on loan.

He joined Witton Albion, and then Northwich Victoria before being  was released by the Vics on 31 December 2010. He then signed for Marine shortly after.

References

External links 

Welsh Premier profile

1988 births
Living people
Footballers from Liverpool
English footballers
Tranmere Rovers F.C. players
The New Saints F.C. players
Northwich Victoria F.C. players
Marine F.C. players
English Football League players
Cymru Premier players
Northern Premier League players
Witton Albion F.C. players
Association football midfielders